Doris Eckert (10 February 1915 – 30 October 2005) was a German hurdler. She competed in the women's 80 metres hurdles at the 1936 Summer Olympics.

References

1915 births
2005 deaths
Athletes (track and field) at the 1936 Summer Olympics
German female hurdlers
Olympic athletes of Germany
Place of birth missing